Homing Head is a headland at the northeast side of Sally Cove on Horseshoe Island, off Graham Land, Antarctica.

References

Headlands of Graham Land
Fallières Coast